Tommy Schnurmacher is a Canadian former radio talk-show host, journalist and political commentator. He was the host of "The Tommy Schnurmacher Show" on CJAD-AM in Montreal, Quebec. From 1996 to 2017 he hosted a talk show airing weekday mornings from 9 o'clock until noon on CJAD, and continues to occasionally return as a guest commentator. 

He won a Gold Ribbon Award in 1997 from the Canadian Association of Broadcasters for a bilingual open-line show he hosted with Gilles Proulx. He also has hosted a cross-country radio show with former Prime Minister Kim Campbell.

References

Filmography

See Also
 Talk Radio Tommy

Anglophone Quebec people
Canadian talk radio hosts
Canadian columnists
Canadian male journalists
Year of birth missing (living people)
Canadian people of Hungarian-Jewish descent
Hungarian emigrants to Canada
Hungarian people of Jewish descent
McGill University alumni